Erich Pohl (15 January 1894 – 8 November 1948) was a German international footballer.

References

1894 births
1948 deaths
Association football midfielders
German footballers
Germany international footballers
VfL Köln 99 players